The Journal of Cardiovascular Translational Research is a peer-reviewed medical journal covering all areas of cardiology. It is published by Springer Science+Business Media on behalf of the International Society for Cardiovascular Translational Research. It was established in 2008 and the editor-in-chief is Enrique Lara-Pezzi, CNIC, Madrid, Spain.

Abstracting and indexing 
The journal is abstracted and indexed in:

According to the Journal Citation Reports, the journal has a 2016 impact factor of 2.319.

References

External links 
 
 International Society for Cardiovascular Translational Research

English-language journals
Cardiology journals
Springer Science+Business Media academic journals
Bimonthly journals
Publications established in 2008